The 1909 Army Cadets football team represented the United States Military Academy in the 1909 college football season. In their second season under head coach Harry Nelly, the Cadets compiled a  record, shut out two of their five opponents, and outscored all opponents by a combined total of 57 to 32.  The team's two losses were to Yale and Harvard; the Army–Navy Game was not played  
 
Tackle Daniel Pullen was selected by The New York Times as a second-team player on its All-America team.

Schedule

References

Army
Army Black Knights football seasons
Army Cadets football